Sir Thomas Banastre KG (c. 1334 - 16 December 1379) was a Knight of the Garter from England.

Lineage
He was the son of Sir Adam Banastre (of Bretherton) and his wife Joan Petronilla (of Claughton) and
was born at Bank Hall, Bretherton, Lancashire in 1334 and was the eldest of five children.

Career
In 1360, he was fighting in France in the campaign led by Edward III, who also knighted at Bourg-la-Reine. Thomas was in Prince Edward's Spanish campaign in 1367 and fought at the battle of Najera on 3 April 1367. During 1369, he was in Anjou and was captured by the French and was exchanged for Sire Caponnel de Caponnat, who was held by the English. During the same year, the Hamlet of Thorp was sold by the heirs of Thorp to Thomas, which became completely merged in his moiety of Bretherton, and ceased to be noticed. This added to his estate, which consisted of farms and land which provided him with his riches.
He became Knight of the Garter in 1375, and became a member of the order of the garter after the death of Walter Paveley.

Death
On 16 December 1379, Thomas Banastre was on board a fleet led by Sir John Arundel which encountered a storm in the Irish Sea, and his ship struck a rock; Thomas was drowned. Sir Hugh Calveley was aboard the same ship but survived.

References

14th-century English people
People of the Hundred Years' War
Medieval English knights
Bank Hall
1379 deaths
Year of birth uncertain
Garter Knights appointed by Edward III